John Cushing may refer to: 

John Cushing (actor) (1719–1790), British stage actor
John Perkins Cushing (1787–1862), American sea merchant, opium smuggler, and philanthropist
John Cushing (judge), Justice of the Massachusetts Supreme Court
John Cushing Jr., Justice of the Massachusetts Supreme Court